Quiza also known as Vuiza (Βούϊζα), which Pliny the Elder called Quiza Xenitana, was a Roman–Berber colonia, located in the former province of Mauretania Caesariensis. The town is identified with ruins at Sidi Bellater, Algiers.

History

Quiza was originally a small Berber village, with Phoenician roots. It grew under the Roman empire. Around 120 AD, the emperor Hadrian erected an arch in the city.

William Smith identified Quiza with Giza near Oran, Algeria in his work, Dictionary of Greek and Roman Geography. More recent investigations have identified it with present-day El-Benian on the coast road between Mostaga and Dara.

In his Natural History, 4.2.3., Pliny the Elder: writes: "Next to this is Quiza Xenitana, a town founded by strangers"; a remark explained because the word Xenitana is derived from Greek ξένος, "a stranger", as explained also by Victor Vitensis. The town is mentioned also by Pliny elsewhere (5.2), by Ptolemy, and by Pomponius Mela.

Bishopric 
Quiza is also a titular see of Christianity. Quaestoriana was in the ecclesiastical province of Byzacena.

At the Council of Carthage (411), which brought together Catholic and Donatist bishops, Quiza was represented by the Catholic Priscus, who had no Donatist counterpart. He is mentioned also in a letter of Saint Augustine to Pope Celestine I. Tiberianus of Quiza was one of the Catholic bishops whom the Arian Vandal king Huneric summoned to Carthage in 484 and then exiled. In addition, the name of a Bishop Vitalianus appears in the mosaic pavement of the excavated  basilica of Quiza.

Bishops

No longer a residential bishopric, Quiza is today listed by the Catholic Church as a titular see.

Priscus fl 411.
 Tiberianus of Quiza fl 484
 Vitalianus
 Adrien André Maria Cimichella, O.S.M. † (5 Jun 1964 Appointed – 21 Jul 2004 Died) 
 José Guadalupe Torres Campos (10 Dec 2005 Appointed – 25 Nov 2008 Appointed, Bishop of Gómez Palacio, Durango) 
 Cirilo B. Flores † (5 Jan 2009 Appointed – 4 Jan 2012 Appointed, Coadjutor Bishop of San Diego, California) 
 Linas (Genadijus) Vodopjanovas, O.F.M. (11 Feb 2012 Appointed – 20 May 2016 Appointed, Bishop of Panevėžys)
 Anthony Randazzo (24 Jun 2016 Appointed - 7 Oct 2019 Appointed, Bishop of Broken Bay)
Ján Kuboš (25 Mar 2020 Appointed)

See also 

 Mauretania Caesariensis

Notes

References

Bibliography

 Laffi, Umberto. Colonie e municipi nello Stato romano  Ed. di Storia e Letteratura. Roma, 2007   
 Mommsen, Theodore. The Provinces of the Roman Empire Section: Roman Africa. (Leipzig 1865; London 1866; London: Macmillan 1909; reprint New York 1996) Barnes & Noble. New York, 1996

Archaeological sites in Algeria
Roman towns and cities in Algeria
Former populated places in Algeria
Ancient Berber cities
Coloniae (Roman)
Catholic titular sees in Africa